Tam Lenfestey (1818–1885) published poetry in Guernsey newspapers and in book form.

Works
 Le Chant des Fontaines (1875)

1818 births
1885 deaths
Guernsey writers
Norman-language poets
History of Guernsey
19th-century poets